Lamao may refer to the following places in the Philippines:

 Lamao, Liloy, barangay in the municipality of Liloy, Zamboanga del Norte
 Lamao, Limay, barangay in the municipality of Limay, Bataan